In literary criticism, an idiot plot is one which is "kept in motion solely by virtue of the fact that everybody involved is an idiot", and where the story would quickly end, or possibly not even happen, if this were not the case. It is a narrative where its conflict comes from characters not recognizing, or not being told, key information that would resolve the conflict, often because of plot contrivance. The only thing that prevents the conflict's resolution is the character's constant avoidance or obliviousness of it throughout the plot, even if it was already obvious to the viewer, so the characters are all "idiots" in that they are too obtuse to simply resolve the conflict immediately.

Science fiction writer and critic Damon Knight, in his 1956 collection In Search of Wonder, says that the term may have originated with author James Blish. Knight went on to coin the term second-order idiot plot as a narrative "in which not merely the principals, but everybody in the whole society has to be a grade-A idiot, or the story couldn't happen".

Critic Roger Ebert wrote in 2005: "I can forgive and even embrace an Idiot Plot in its proper place (consider Astaire and Rogers in Top Hat). But when the characters have depth and their decisions have consequences, I grow restless when their misunderstandings could be ended by words that the screenplay refuses to allow them to utter." Alternate formulations describe only the protagonist as being an idiot.

Writing in 2013, author David Brin explored one variation of the idiot plot. In most adventure films and novels, the writers and directors have an imperative to keep their protagonists in jeopardy. This becomes difficult if they are surrounded by skilled professionals, paid to intervene and help if called. Hence, storytellers feel compelled to separate their characters from meaningful help, so that any assistance they receive is either late or else below the level of danger offered by the antagonists. The more powerful the villains, the more competent that help is allowed to be. "But for the most part, institutions and your neighbors are portrayed as sheep, so that only the hero's actions truly matter."

Examples 
 Roger Ebert describes the 1935 film Top Hat as an idiot plot, depending as it does on "a misunderstanding that is all but impossible", relying on the fact that Ginger Rogers' character has somehow never met her best friend's husband, and is able to mistake a complete stranger (played by Fred Astaire) for him, and for that misunderstanding to continue without being questioned. Ebert notes that the situation "could be cleared up at any moment by one line of sensible dialogue", yet the writers deliberately avoid doing so to keep the plot in motion.
 Writer Dennis Russell Bailey commented about the Star Trek: The Next Generation episode "Samaritan Snare" that "none of the plot could have happened if all of the characters hadn't suddenly became morons that week", ignoring the advice of expert officers and disregarding elementary security procedures.

See also
 Plot hole
 The Comedy of Errors
 Farce

References

Narratology
20th-century neologisms
Narrative techniques